Juan Carlos Uder (24 April 1927 – 14 July 2020) was an Argentine basketball player who competed in the 1948 Summer Olympics and in the 1952 Summer Olympics.

References

1927 births
2020 deaths
Argentine men's basketball players
Olympic basketball players of Argentina
Basketball players at the 1948 Summer Olympics
Basketball players at the 1951 Pan American Games
Basketball players at the 1952 Summer Olympics
Basketball players at the 1955 Pan American Games
Pan American Games silver medalists for Argentina
Pan American Games medalists in basketball
FIBA World Championship-winning players
Medalists at the 1951 Pan American Games
Medalists at the 1955 Pan American Games
1950 FIBA World Championship players